Soda lake may refer to:

 A soda lake or alkaline lake (a lake with high alkalinity)
Soda Lake (San Bernardino County) in California
Soda Lake (San Luis Obispo County) in California
Soda Lakes (Soda Lake and Little Soda Lake, near Fallon, Nevada)
Soda Lake (Washington State) 
A number of Rift Valley lakes in Africa
 a salt lake